Dimerosaccus is a genus of trematodes in the family Opecoelidae. It consists of only one species, Dimerosaccus oncorhynchi (Eguchi, 1931) Shimazu, 1980. It has been synonymised with Allocreadium oncorhynchi Eguchi, 1931, Plagioporus honshuensis Moravec & Nagasawa, 1998, and P. oncorhynchi (Eguchi, 1931) Peters, 1957.

References

Opecoelidae
Plagiorchiida genera
Monotypic protostome genera